Der Kommissar may refer to:
"Der Kommissar" (song), the name of a 1981/1982 hit single by the Austrian musician Falco, covered in 1983 by the British act After the Fire
Der Kommissar (album), an album by After the Fire
Der Kommissar (German: "The Commissioner"), a term used in relation to law enforcement in Germany
Der Kommissar - The CBS Recordings, a reissue of After the Fire's albums
Der Kommissar (TV series), a German TV series
 Der Kommissar (fashion), lingerie line of Annelies Nuy